Mohammad-Javad Ardeshir Larijani (born ) is an Iranian conservative politician and former diplomat. He is currently a top adviser to the Ayatollah Ali Khamenei in foreign affairs and secretary of High Council for Human rights, Judiciary of Islamic Republic of Iran.

He has been a key planner of Iran's foreign policy, and led the ceasefire negotiations after Iran–Iraq War.

Early life and education
Mamad Larijani was born to Iranian parents and is a brother of Ali Larijani, former chairman of the Parliament and Sadegh Larijani, former chief justice. Larijani is a cousin of Ahmad Tavakkoli, who is the current director of Majlis Research Center.

Larijani, raised in a religious family, graduated from a hawza before starting his higher education in electrical engineering in Aryamehr University, wearing the uniform for the full four years. He later continued his studies outside Iran, in the PhD program in mathematics at the University of California, Berkeley. Although there are reports that he has not finished his studies in Berkeley, according to Allyn Jackson, Larijani may have received his PhD from Berkeley in 1980 under the supervision of Robert Vaught. He is a professor at Imam Sadegh University and Sharif University of Technology.

Career
Larijani is one of the top advisors to the supreme leader and the head of the human rights council in the judiciary. The council rejects and condemns appointment of Special Rapporteur on Human Rights in Iran by United Nations and strongly opposes the western countries' positions about current human rights situation in Iran. Iran has repeatedly been accused of human rights violations, most recently after the November 2019 protests. The UN Report of the Special Rapporteur on the situation of human rights in the Islamic Republic of Iran has expressed "The Special Rapporteur is shocked at the number of deaths, serious injuries and reports of ill-treatment of persons detained during the November 2019 protests. According to reports, detainees are being tortured or are suffering other forms of ill-treatment, sometimes to extract forced confessions. There are also reports of denials of medical treatment, including for injuries caused by the excessive use of force by the security forces, with some other detainees being held incommunicado or being subjected to enforced disappearance. He is concerned about reports that families of individuals killed by the security forces have been threatened not to speak out. He remains highly concerned about the continuing restrictions on freedom of expression."
Additionally Larijani has been the director of Institute for Studies in Theoretical Physics and Mathematics in Tehran. Previously, he was a Majlis representative and the director of Majlis Research Center. He served as deputy minister of foreign affairs in the 1980s.

Views
In a 2010 NBC News interview, Larijani defended the arrest of Nasrin Sotoudeh, an Iranian feminist activist, and a prominent human rights lawyer. Sotoudeh was detained in September and faces trial for "collusion against national security" and "spreading propaganda against the Islamic Republic.". Larijani told NBC News that Iranian authorities believed that she was engaged "in a very nasty campaign" against Iran's national security. Nasrin Sotoudeh works for Shirin Ebadi's law firm. Shirin Ebadi is the 2003 Nobel Peace Prize recipient.

In November 2011, Larijani claimed that nuclear weapons violate Islam.

In response to the Mahsa Amini protests, Larijani said on Iranian broadcast Channel 3 (Iran) which has been translated by MEMRI, "[Mahsa Amini] was detained by the police, and she was in a classroom when she suddenly collapsed. The police were enforcing the limitation on public nudity. You may call it 'hijab,' modesty, or whatever, but in all countries – without exception – there are limits on public nudity."

Controversies

Views on capital punishment for narcotic offenses 
Larijani has praised Iranian Judiciary for capital punishment of narcotic offenses. He has stated that the world should learn from Iran on this matter.

Views on Obama 
Larijani has stated on Barack Obama that "Since Obama came to office he spoke of dialogue with Iran, What has happened that this black "kaka" is talking about regime change in Iran". This statement was widely condemned by many Iranian politicians.

References

External links

 Larijani's information page at Institute for Studies in Theoretical Physics and Mathematics 
 

1951 births
Living people
Sharif University of Technology alumni
Members of the 2nd Islamic Consultative Assembly
Iranian Vice Ministers
Iranian expatriates in Iraq
Members of the 4th Islamic Consultative Assembly
Members of the 5th Islamic Consultative Assembly
People from Amol
Academic staff of the Institute for Research in Fundamental Sciences